Neil Aaron Weber (born December 6, 1972) is a former Major League Baseball pitcher. In four career games, he had a 0-0 record with an 11.57 ERA. He batted and threw left-handed.

Weber was drafted by the Montreal Expos in the 8th round of the 1993 amateur draft.

External links

1972 births
Living people
Arizona Diamondbacks players
Major League Baseball pitchers
Cuesta Cougars baseball players
Baseball players from California
Sportspeople from Newport Beach, California
Albuquerque Dukes players
American expatriate baseball players in Canada
Bowie Baysox players
Harrisburg Senators players
Jamestown Expos players
Louisville RiverBats players
Ottawa Lynx players
Rochester Red Wings players
San Antonio Missions players
Tucson Sidewinders players
West Palm Beach Expos players